Pleione chunii is a species of plant in the family Orchidaceae. It is endemic to southern China.

References

Endemic orchids of China
chunii
Vulnerable plants
Taxonomy articles created by Polbot